Amdon is a digital learning tool for students and professionals.

Amdon operates as a wholesale e-learning marketplace for learners, content providers and publishers. Amdon was listed as “10 Most Promising Education Technology Solution Provider in 2016” to aid educational institutions and organisations by APAC CIO Outlook.

History
Amdon was founded in 2001 by its CEO, Mr. Eric Lam.

in 2006, Amdon was invited to pilot its interactive courseware in Science, Mathematics and English in a middle school in Qatar. As part of this project, Amdon supplied the courseware for students and teachers to use with the tablet PC. During this year, Amdon also took part in the trade show at International Science Education Conference 2006, organised by Singapore’s National Institute of Education.

In 2009, Amdon became a partner for Future School Project at Crescent Girls’ School under the initiative of Info-communications Development Authority and Ministry of Education to develop Digital Interactive Textbook and Multi-touch Games.

In 2011, Amdon was commissioned by the National Crime Prevention Council of Singapore to develop Cyberonia, a multiplayer-online game to teach primary level students cyber wellness.

In 2012, Amdon's flagship interactive textbook,  won the Best Educational Software Award 2011 and Singapore Promising Brand Award. During the same year, Amdon created PageWerkz, an interactive workbook platform for the PC, Mac and tablet devices.

In 2016, Amdon and CEO Eric Lam were featured on the cover story by APAC CIO Outlook magazine as a notable player in the e-learning industry.

Products

PageWerkz
Amdon’s flagship product is PageWerkz, a patented online-offline hybrid content hosting technology. The platform is currently being used by schools and publishers in Singapore, Taiwan, India, United Arab Emirates, United Kingdom, United States and New Zealand. PageWerkz is currently available for Windows® and Apple® computers and for iPad® and Android™ tablets.

ScienceWerkz
ScienceWerkz is a line of science education apps comprising a series of interactive science ebooks developed by Amdon and published by Werkz Publishing Inc, one of Amdon’s subsidiaries. In 2013, ScienceWerkz won the 18th Annual Education Review Software (EDDIE) Award.

AmBook
Ambook is an interactive science workbook designed for primary and secondary school students. Ambook was developed to target students who dislike science, aiming to change their views on the subject. AmBook is  endorsed by Dr. Rodger Bybee, a renowned expert in Science education and assessment and Chair of the Science Forum and Science Expert Group. Ambook is available in English and Chinese.

CoolScience
CoolScience is  a collection of interactive simulations to help promote scientific inquiry in learners at primary and secondary levels.

Other Products
Amdon also develops applications and games that promote learning.

References

External links 
 Amdon official website

Ebooks
Electronic publishing
Electronic paper technology
Educational technology companies of Singapore
Educational software
Education companies of Singapore